Parry is a given name which may refer to the following people:

Parry Aftab, American lawyer specializing in Internet privacy and security law
Parry Glasspool (born 1992), British actor
Parry Gordon (1945–2009), English rugby league footballer
Parry Gripp (born 1967), songwriter, lead vocalist and guitarist for the pop punk band Nerf Herder
Parry Wayne Humphreys (1778–1839), member of the United States House of Representatives from Tennessee
Parry Liyanage, Sri Lankan army officer, athlete and coach
Parry Mitchell, Baron Mitchell (born 1943), British businessman and Labour member of the House of Lords
Parry Moon (1898-1988), American engineer
Parry Nickerson (born 1994), American football player
Parry O'Brien (1932-2007), American shot putter
Parry Shen (born 1973), American actor
Parry Teasdale, American video artist
E. Parry Thomas (born 1921), American banker who helped finance the development of the casino industry of Las Vegas

See also
Perry (given name)

English-language masculine given names